Antipterna panarga is a species of moth in the family Oecophoridae, first described by Alfred Jefferis Turner in 1932 as Periallactis panarga. The species epithet, panarga, derives from the Greek, παναργος ("wholly white").  The male holotype for Periallactis panarga was collected at Crows Nest in Queensland.

References

Further reading 
 

Oecophorinae
Taxa described in 1932
Taxa named by Alfred Jefferis Turner